John Barrett (August 29, 1895 – March 1974) was an American football player. He played college football as a prominent halfback for the Washington & Lee Generals, once running 90 yards on Cornell. In 1920 he played for the Chicago Tigers in the inaugural season of the National Football League, then known as the APFA.

References

1895 births
1974 deaths
American football halfbacks
Washington and Lee Generals football players
Chicago Tigers players